Balugaon railway station is a railway station on the East Coast Railway network in the state of Odisha, India. It serves Balugaon town. Its code is BALU. It has four platforms. Passenger, MEMU, Express and Superfast trains halt at Balugaon railway station.

Major trains

 Guwahati–Bengaluru Cantt. Superfast Express
 Guwahati–Secunderabad Express
 Thiruvananthapuram–Silchar Superfast Express
 Ernakulam–Patna Express (via Chennai)
 Santragachi–Chennai Central Antyodaya Express
 Paradeep–Visakhapatnam Express
 Konark Express
 Gurudev Express
 Thiruvananthapuram–Silchar Superfast Express
 Yesvantpur–Muzaffarpur Weekly Express
 Thiruvananthpuram–Shalimar Express
 Howrah–Yesvantpur Superfast Express
 Hirakud Express
 Hirakhand Express
 East Coast Express
 Puri–Ahmedabad Express
 Prashanti Express
 Bhubaneswar–Tirupati Superfast Express
 Puri–Okha Dwarka Express
 Rourkela–Gunupur Rajya Rani Express
 Howrah–Chennai Mail
 Bhubaneswar–Bangalore Cantonment Superfast Express
 Falaknuma Express
 Bhubaneshwar–Visakhapatnam Intercity Express
 Visakha Express
 Puri–Tirupati Express
 Puducherry–Bhubaneswar Superfast Express
 Bhubaneswar–Chennai Central Express
 Visakhapatnam–Tatanagar Weekly Superfast Express
 Gandhidham–Puri Weekly Express

Gallery

References

See also
 Khordha district

Railway stations in Khorda district
Khurda Road railway division